Brian Derksen (born November 27, 1951) is a Canadian former professional ice hockey defenceman.

During the 1973–74 season, Derksen played one game in the World Hockey Association with the Los Angeles Sharks.

Career statistics

References

External links

1951 births
Living people
Canadian ice hockey defencemen
Fort Worth Texans players
Greensboro Generals (EHL) players
Greensboro Generals (SHL) players
Los Angeles Sharks players
Muskegon Mohawks players
Oklahoma City Blazers (1965–1977) players
Providence Reds players
Saskatoon Blades players
Winston-Salem Polar Twins (SHL) players
Canadian expatriate ice hockey players in the United States